Derrick Townshend (19 April 1944 – 8 June 2013) was a Zimbabwean cricketer. He played five first-class matches for Rhodesia between 1967 and 1969.

References

External links
 

1944 births
2013 deaths
Zimbabwean cricketers
Rhodesia cricketers
Cricketers from Johannesburg